Zgornji Boč is a settlement in the hills above the left bank of the Drava River in the Municipality of Selnica ob Dravi in northeastern Slovenia.

References

External links
Zgornji Boč on Geopedia

Populated places in the Municipality of Selnica ob Dravi